Saint Donatus of Euroea was a Greek saint, who is revered in both by both Eastern Orthodox and Roman Catholics, mostly in Albania and Greece.

Donatus was born in  Euroea, Epirus Vetus (northwestern Greece) and lived during the reign of the Emperor Theodosius I. According to the 5th-century historian Sozomen, Saint Donatus was Bishop of Euroea, identifiable with Glyko in Epirus, Greece. The saint is said to have accomplished several miracles, such as successfully fighting a dragon, purifying well waters, saving the emperors' daughter, and reviving the dead.

Saint Donatus of Butrint died in 387 and his remains were transferred to Kassiopi in Corfu in 602 in order to be saved from barbarian invasions. However this led to a problem of jurisdiction and custody for the holy relics, which was resolved by Pope Gregory I. Donatus's cult was widespread in the Middle Ages.

His feast day is April 30.

Umbriatico Cathedral in Calabria in the south of Italy is dedicated to him: the area was occupied by Epirote troops after the conquest of Nikephoros Phokas the Elder in the 9th century, who brought with them the cults of the saints familiar to them.

See also
Saint Therinus

References

387 deaths
4th-century bishops in the Roman Empire
4th-century Christian saints
Ancient Epirotes
People from Buthrotum
Year of birth unknown